The Filmgroup was a production and distribution company founded by filmmakers Roger Corman and Gene Corman in 1959. Corman used it to make and distribute his own movies, as opposed to ones he was making for American International Pictures. (The reason is that AIP required films to be shot using union crews; working on his own, Corman could save money by going non-union.) The company ultimately folded, however, lessons from running the company helped Corman make a success later of New World Pictures. Filmgroup also produced early feature work of Francis Ford Coppola, Peter Bogdanovich, Charles B. Griffith, Curtis Harrington, Jack Hill, Monte Hellman, Robert Towne and Jack Nicholson.

History
Corman established his own company, Palo Alto Productions, in 1954, which was responsible for his first two movies. Filmgroup came out of a desire for Corman to move into distribution.

In February 1959 Filmgroup announced they would release ten films. Their first movies were High School Big Shot (1959) and T-Bird Gang (1959) produced by Stanley Bickman.

Corman would also buy films made by independent distributors, in addition to several films from the Soviet Union, which he would re-dub and have additional scenes shot and added to.

Gene Corman left the company in 1963 to join 20th Century-Fox and Corman handed over distribution of his films to American International Pictures. The company soon wound up.

Corman never bothered to copyright the movies so most of them are in the public domain.

Filmography
 High School Big Shot (1959) – directed by Joel Rapp
 T-Bird Gang (1959) – directed by Richard Harbinger
 Beast from Haunted Cave (1959) – written by Charles B. Griffith, produced by Gene Corman, directed by Monte Hellman
 The Wasp Woman (1959) – directed by Roger Corman
 Creature from the Haunted Sea (1961) – written by Charles B. Griffith directed by Roger Corman
 Atlas (1960) – written by Charles B. Griffith directed by Roger Corman
 Battle of Blood Island (1960) – directed by Joel Rapp. First film adaption of a book by Philip Roth.
 Date Bait (1960) – directed by O'Dale Ireland
 High School Caesar (1960) – starring John Ashley
 Ski Troop Attack (1960) – written by Charles B. Griffith directed by Roger Corman
 The Girl in Lovers Lane (1960) – directed by Charles R. Rondeau
 Last Woman on Earth (1960) – written by Robert Towne, directed by Roger Corman
 The Wild Ride (1960) – starring Jack Nicholson
 The Little Shop of Horrors (1960) – written by Charles B. Griffith directed by Roger Corman
 Magic Voyage of Sinbad (1961) – acquired from the Soviet company Mosfilm
 The Intruder (1962) – produced by Gene Corman, directed by Roger Corman
 Devil's Partner (1958) – a pick up, released in 1962
 Mermaids of Tiburon (1962) – acquired from Pacific Productions
 Pirate of the Black Hawk (1961) – directed by  Sergio Grieco
 Battle Beyond the Sun (1962) – US sequences directed by Francis Ford Coppola
 Dementia 13 (1963) – directed by Francis Ford Coppola
 Night Tide (1963) – directed by Curtis Harrington
 The Terror (1963) – directed by Roger Corman
 Voyage to the Prehistoric Planet (1965) – US sequences directed by Curtis Harrington
 Queen of Blood (1966) – directed by Curtis Harrington
 Voyage to the Planet of Prehistoric Women (1968) – US sequences directed by Peter Bogdanovich

Unmade Films
The following films were among those which Corman announced would be produced by Filmgroup but which were never made:
 Cop Killer and Sob Sisters Don't Cry –  based on original scripts by Malden Harms
 Wedding Night –  from script by Robert Roark
 I Flew a Spy Plane Over Russia –  based on a script by Robert Towne
 Murder at the Convention –  a political mystery satire from a script by Arthur Sandys starring Dick Miller and Jonathan Haze
 Pan and the Satyrs
 The Man Who Sold the Earth (1962)
 Women in War (1962)
 Haunted Dream (1962)
 Juliet (1962)
 The Story of Robert E. Lee by Robert Adams
 Fun and Profit by Joel Rapp and Sam Locke
 The Wild Surfers by John Lamb

References

Film production companies of the United States
Mass media companies established in 1959
Mass media companies disestablished in 1968